Cantin is a French surname common in Canada. It may refer to the following people:

 Narcisse Cantin (1870–1940), founder of Johnson's Mills, a failed planned community in Ontario, Canada 
 Jean-Charles Cantin (1918–2005), Canadian politician
 Marc Cantin (1933–1990), Canadian physician and professor
 Paolo Fernandes Cantin
 Serge Cantin (b. 1945), Canadian bobsledder
 Jean Pierre Cantin (b. 1966), Canadian judoka
 Sylvie Cantin (b. 1970), Canadian speed skater
 Dave Cantin (b. 1979), American entrepreneur

French-language surnames